Com Hem was a Swedish brand owned by Tele2 AB which supplied Triple Play services that included cable television, broadband internet and fixed-line telephone.

Founded in 1983 as Televerket Kabel-TV as part of the former state-owned Televerket, the company was successively named Svenska Kabel-TV AB and Telia InfoMedia TeleVision AB, before becoming 'Com Hem' (a play on the Swedish phrase Kom hem, "come home") in 1999. In 2003, Telia had to sell Com Hem to EQT Partners to satisfy EU competition requirements as a result of its merger with Sonera of Finland that same year.

In 2021 the company had 135+ TV channels available. Digital TV was introduced in 1997. A broadband service that used the company's proprietary cable network was launched in 1999. In 2004 VoIP telephone was introduced, and the company became Sweden's first nationwide triple play service provider.

All households connected to the Com Hem Cable Network had access to broadband Internet services, services, fixed-line telephony and a wide range of TV channels. Com Hem also provided interactive services that facilitated management, communication and maintenance for property owners.

The company had around 1000 employees, with offices in Stockholm, Gothenburg, Malmö, Västerås, Härnösand, Sundsvall and Örnsköldsvik.

In 2011, EQT sold the company to BC Partners. Com Hem held its initial public offering (IPO) on 17 June 2014 and became listed on Stockholm Stock Exchange. On 27 April 2017 Kinnevik acquired approximately 18.5% of the stock and became Com Hem's largest stock holder. Com Hem also operated mobile services as an MVNO using its own brand and since early-2020, also with an online-only brand called Penny (managed by Tele2 since 2021) whose operations are modelled after Google Fi, and is also a broadband flanker brand using Com Hem/Tele2's fixed-line infrastructure. Com Hem's mobile services utilised the Tele2 (SUNAB and Net4Mobility) infrastructure in 2G GSM, 3G UMTS and 4G LTE.

Com Hem had been ranked as the TV brand with the least satisfied customers in Sweden in 2007, 2008 and 2009 according to Svenskt Kvalitetsindex, an independent customer survey company. It has since almost reached the top of the ranking with the most satisfied customers, according to the same source.
Analogue channels were withdrawn from the cable television network on 8 September 2020.

On 27 April 2021, the owner Tele2 discontinued the use of the Com Hem brand, while continuing to provide the same services under its own brand.

Analogue channels - Withdrawn
NFL Network
Animal Planet
Travel + Escape (TV channel)
The Learning Channel
W Network
History Channel
Hunan Television
SVT1
SVT2
TV3
TV4
Kanal 5
TV6
TV7 
TV8
Kanal 9
TV10
Kanal 11
TV12
MTV
TV4 Sport
SVT24
SVTB
Love Nature
CNN International
Golf Channel
Makeful
CNBC
WWE Network
Fashion TV
SET International
DW-TV
CTi International
SAB TV
Kunskapskanalen

The analogue package could also include a few local channels, usually an open access channel such as public access channels known as Öppna Kanalen (sv). In areas near Denmark, Norway or Finland, Com Hem usually included channels from the neighboring countries such as TV Finland, YLE TV1, DR1, TV2 Denmark and NRK1.

Digital channels

See also
 List of Swedish television channels

References

External links
 Official Com Hem website
 Official Com Hem Group website (in English)

Telecommunications companies established in 1983
Television in Sweden
Cable television companies
Internet service providers of Sweden
VoIP services
VoIP companies of Sweden
Private equity portfolio companies
The Carlyle Group companies
Providence Equity Partners companies
Telecommunications companies of Sweden
Companies based in Stockholm
Companies listed on Nasdaq Stockholm
Swedish companies established in 1983